Ahmad Ali Bradshaw is a former American football quarterback who played for the Army Black Knights.

Football career 
Before committing to West Point, Bradshaw was recruited by Illinois, Michigan, and Northwestern, who all asked him about switching to cornerback. At West Point, Bradshaw was a three-year starter at quarterback. Before the start of the 2016 season, Bradshaw abruptly left the program, but later returned. At the end of the 2017 Army Black Knights football season, Bradshaw had rushed for a service academy record 1,746 yards and 14 touchdowns, helping Army to a 10–3 season and their first Commander in Chief's Trophy since 1996. Bradshaw became the first Army quarterback since Ronnie McAda to beat Navy in back-to-back seasons.

Controversy 
Bradshaw was accused of rape by a female cadet in September 2014. After an internal investigation, West Point concluded that the allegations were "unfounded".

Controversially, Bradshaw was still allowed to remain a member of the football team despite being in violation of the Cadet Code of Honor.

References

External links
 Army profile

Year of birth missing (living people)
Living people
American football quarterbacks
Army Black Knights football players
Players of American football from Chicago
African-American players of American football
21st-century African-American people
Military personnel from Chicago